Dearly Departed Tours and Artifact Museum is a bus tour of some well-known Hollywood deadly event locations, such as the site of the Manson murders. The company offers several tours focusing on different events. The tours are accompanied by a guide who explains the tragic events that occurred at each location.

The museum is located on Santa Monica Boulevard, across from the Hollywood Forever Cemetery in Los Angeles, California, and it opened to the public in April, 2017. The location includes the meeting place lobby for the Dearly Departed Tours and the adjoining Artifact Museum with its centerpiece of Jayne Mansfield’s death car, a smashed 1966 Buick Electra sedan. As of 2022, the museum has closed, and tours have moved to their YouTube page.

References

External list
 

2017 establishments in California
Museums in Los Angeles
Museums established in 2017